Showtime Live Taichung Station is a shopping mall in East District, Taichung, Taiwan that opened on March 9, 2017.

History
 On October 29, 2014, groundbreaking ceremony of the mall was held.
 Trial operation took place on January 24, 2017.
 The mall officially opened on March 9, 2017.

Gallery

See also
 List of tourist attractions in Taiwan
 Showtime Live Chiayi
 Showtime Live Taitung
 Showtime Live Taichung Wenxin
 Showtime Live Shulin

References

External links

2017 establishments in Taiwan
Shopping malls in Taichung
Shopping malls established in 2017